Raivo E. Tamm (born 15 July 1965) is an Estonian actor and politician. In 2019, he was elected a member of the XIV Riigikogu.

Tamm was born in Tallinn. In 1988 he graduated from Estonian Academy of Music and Theatre in actor specialty. 1988-1993 he was an actor for Vanalinnastuudio theatre; 1994-1999 in Tallinn City Theater.

Since 2019 he is a member of Isamaa party.

Personal life

Tamm was married to actress Katariina Unt from 1997 until their divorce in 2003. The couple had a daughter. He next married actress Külli Palmsaar, with whom he had a daughter. The couple later divorced. In 2007, he married actress Helena Merzin, with whom he has a son, born in 2015.

Selected filmography
Õnne 13 (1993–present)
Malev (2005)
Shop of Dreams (2005)
Autumn Ball (2007)
The Temptation of St. Tony (2009)
Mushrooming (2012)

References

External links

Living people
1965 births
Estonian male film actors
Estonian male stage actors
Estonian male television actors
20th-century Estonian male actors
21st-century Estonian male actors
Isamaa politicians
Members of the Riigikogu, 2019–2023
Estonian Academy of Music and Theatre alumni
Recipients of the Order of the White Star, 4th Class
Male actors from Tallinn
Politicians from Tallinn